George Herman Weissleder (December 13, 1879 – November 26, 1946) was an American coppersmith, businessman and lawyer who served as a Democratic member of the Wisconsin State Senate and the Wisconsin State Assembly.

Biography
Weissleder was born in Hartford, Wisconsin. He attended Marquette University and Milwaukee Law School.

On August 27, 1913, Weissleder married Anna M. Fuhrmann. They had two children. He died on November 26, 1946 in Milwaukee, Wisconsin and is buried at Calvary Cemetery.

Career
Weissleder was elected to the Senate in 1912. In 1932, he was elected to the Assembly to succeed Otto Kehrein.

References

External links

People from Hartford, Wisconsin
Democratic Party Wisconsin state senators
Marquette University alumni
Milwaukee Law School alumni
1879 births
1946 deaths
Coppersmiths
Democratic Party members of the Wisconsin State Assembly